The 25th Annual American Music Awards were held on January 26, 1998, at the Shrine Auditorium, in Los Angeles, California. The awards recognized the most popular artists and albums from the year 1997.

The Spice Girls were the biggest winners of the night, winning all of the three awards they were nominated for, while Puff Daddy didn't win any of the five awards he had been nominated for.

Performances

Notes
  Pretaped in Dublin, Ireland, on January 21st.

Winners and nominees

References
 http://www.rockonthenet.com/archive/1998/amas.htm

1998